The 2016–17 FC Augsburg season was the 110th season in the club's history and 6th consecutive and overall season in the top flight of German football, the Bundesliga, having been promoted from the 2. Bundesliga in 2011. In addition to the Bundesliga, FC Augsburg also participated in the DFB-Pokal. This was the 8th season in which Augsburg played at the WWK Arena, located in Augsburg, Bavaria, Germany. The season covers a period from 1 July 2016 to 30 June 2017.

After a mixed campaign, Augsburg finished in 13th place on 38 points, whilst they were knocked out of the DFB-Pokal by eventual semi-finalists and Bundesliga champions Bayern Munich.

Season overview

Players

Squad

Transfers

In

Out

Statistics

Friendly matches

Competitions

Overview

Bundesliga

League table

Results summary

Results by round

Matches

DFB-Pokal

Statistics

Appearances and goals

|-
! colspan=14 style=background:#dcdcdc; text-align:center| Goalkeepers

|-
! colspan=14 style=background:#dcdcdc; text-align:center| Defenders

|-
! colspan=14 style=background:#dcdcdc; text-align:center| Midfielders

|-
! colspan=14 style=background:#dcdcdc; text-align:center| Forwards

|-
! colspan=14 style=background:#dcdcdc; text-align:center| Players transferred out during the season

Goalscorers

Last updated: 13 May 2017

Clean sheets

Last updated: 20 May 2017

Disciplinary record

Last updated: 20 May 2017

References

External links

Augsburg, FC
FC Augsburg seasons